Punt Road Oval, also known by naming rights sponsorship as the Swinburne Centre, is an Australian rules football ground and former cricket oval located within the Yarra Park precinct of East Melbourne, Victoria, situated a few hundred metres to the east of the Melbourne Cricket Ground (MCG).

The oval is a former venue of the Victorian Football League (now Australian Football League), with 544 VFL/AFL premiership matches played there between 1908 and 1964. The venue is the training and administrative headquarters of the Richmond Football Club, and also hosts the club's reserves and women's premiership matches.

History
In October 1855 an application was made for the Richmond Cricket Club to play matches on the Richmond paddock next to the site occupied by the Melbourne Cricket Club. The first documented cricket match on the oval was played on 27 December 1856. The venue remained the home ground for the Richmond Cricket Club until the end of the 2010/11 season. In 2011/12, the club moved to Central Reserve, Glen Waverley.

It was used as the home ground by the Richmond Football Club in the Victorian Football Association (VFA) from 1885 to 1907 then in the Victorian Football League (VFL) from 1908 to 1964. It was also used by the Melbourne Football Club during and immediately after World War II, when the MCG became a military base. Not until late 1946 were Melbourne able to play the MCG again. In round 4 of the 1956 season, Melbourne played a one off home game at Punt Road against Fitzroy, this time due to renovations at the MCG in preparation for the 1956 Summer Olympics. Owing to the arrangement of the draw for 1942, South Melbourne played one home game there against Hawthorn when Richmond had the bye.

After the 1964 season, the capacity of the venue was to be reduced to only 22,000, after much of the outer was to be lost to the widening by 50 ft of Punt Road, a notorious traffic bottleneck. Under the stewardship of President Ray Dunn, Richmond negotiated to move its home games to the Melbourne Cricket Ground starting from 1965. The last senior VFL game was played at the venue on 22 August 1964, between Richmond and Hawthorn, where Richmond was beaten by 31 points. The club retained the venue as its training and administrative base, despite moving its home games.

In November 1999 it hosted a Mercantile Mutual Cup match between Victoria and Canberra.

Ground records (VFL/AFL)
Most Goals (Individual) in a Match: 14 by Doug Strang (Richmond vs , Round 2 1931)
Highest Score: 199 (Richmond 30.19 (199) def.  4.7 (31), Round 2 1931) 
Lowest Score: 16 (Richmond 8.6 (54) def.  1.10 (16), Round 15 1910)
Greatest Winning Margin: 168 (Richmond 30.19 (199) def.  4.7 (31), Round 2 1931) 
Drawn Matches: 6
Record attendance: 46,000 (Richmond vs , Round 9 1949)

NB: In 2017, Richmond's reserves team exceeded the above record for highest score and winning margin - Richmond 33.21 (219) def. North Ballarat 4.7 (31) - in Round 1 of the VFA/VFL.

Current use

The ground is still used for training by the Richmond Football Club and it remains the club's administrative headquarters. A statue of Tigers legend Jack Dyer is outside the ground. A $20 million redevelopment was completed in 2011. The redeveloped sports facilities at Punt Road Oval accommodate a range of business and community sports organisations, including Klim Swim, the VRI Fencing Club and the Indigenous Youth Education Centre known as the Korin Gamaji Institute.

The naming rights for the ground were then sold to ME Bank. In 2017 it was commercially re-branded as the Swinburne Centre at Punt Road Oval.

Since being re-established in 2014, the Richmond reserves team has played its VFL home games at the venue. The club's VFL Women's team, which began playing in 2018 though was dissolved at the end of the following season, also played home matches at the venue. The Richmond senior women's team, of the AFL Women's competition, played their first home match at Punt Road on 31 January 2021, after playing the previous season home matches at the larger capacity Princes Park in Carlton.

When Richmond defeated Adelaide in the 2017 Grand Final to win their first flag in 37 years, the venue hosted an official Richmond viewing party that attracted 15,000 people.

In November 2020 the Richmond Football Club announced its intention to oversee the redevelopment of the venue; to incorporate a larger playing surface, the demolition of the historic Jack Dyer Stand to make way for a new grandstand with public seating and amenities, and construction of additional playing facilities and a function space. The proposed $60 million redevelopment 
has received approximately half the necessary funding from the Victorian and Federal Government, with the remaining amount to be raised by the club and the AFL. One year later the club unveiled the designs and schematics for the proposal, featuring the new stand built on the club’s current carpark and feature two levels of seating, including some undercover, boosting the ground’s capacity to 8,000. There are also enhanced facilities for players, function and community spaces and underground carparking for 280 vehicles. The club has stated it hopes for the facility to be completed before the 2024 season.

References

External links

"Around the Grounds" - Web Documentary - Punt Road
Richmond Football Club website
Australian Football League website
VFL/AFL Attendance Records
Punt Road Oval statistics from AFL Tables

Defunct Australian Football League grounds
Victorian Football League grounds
Sports venues in Melbourne
Cricket grounds in Australia
Sports venues completed in 1856
1856 establishments in Australia
Sport in the City of Melbourne (LGA)
Buildings and structures in the City of Melbourne (LGA)
East Melbourne, Victoria
Richmond Football Club